Ambegaon Assembly constituency is one of the many constituencies of the Maharashtra Vidhan Sabha located in the Pune district.

It is a part of the Shirur (Lok Sabha constituency) in the Pune district along with five other assembly constituencies, viz Junnar, Khed Alandi, Shirur, Bhosari and Hadapsar.

Dilip Walse-Patil is the current MLA and chairperson in the Maharashtra Government.

Members of Legislative Assembly

^ by-poll

Results

General election 2019

References

Assembly constituencies of Pune district
Assembly constituencies of Maharashtra